Sebastian Bösel (born 24 October 1994) is a German former professional footballer who played as a midfielder.

References

1994 births
Living people
People from Wunsiedel (district)
Sportspeople from Upper Franconia
German footballers
Footballers from Bavaria
Association football midfielders
FC Bayern Munich II players
SG Sonnenhof Großaspach players
1. FC Saarbrücken players
Hallescher FC players
3. Liga players
Regionalliga players